Tlacolula Valley Zapotec or Valley Zapotec, known by its regional name Dizhsa, and formerly known by the varietal name Guelavia Zapotec (Zapoteco de San Juan Guelavía) is a Zapotec language  of Oaxaca, Mexico.

Tlacolula Valley Zapotec is a cluster of Zapotec languages spoken in the western Tlacolula Valley, which show varying degrees of mutual intelligibility. All varieties of Valley Zapotec are endangered. The languages in this group include:

Santa Ana del Valle Zapotec
Teotitlán del Valle Zapotec
San Lucas Quiaviní Zapotec
Tlacolula de Matamoros Zapotec
San Juan Guelavía Zapotec
San Jerónimo Tlacochahuaya Zapotec
San Juan Teitipac Zapotec

Teotitlán del Valle dialect is divergent, 59% intelligible to San Juan Guelavía proper. Valley Zapotec is also spoken in the city of Oaxaca, capital of the state of Oaxaca.

In April 2014, linguist Brook Danielle Lillehaugen, along with students from Haverford and Swarthmore Colleges, visited Tlacolula de Matamoros to present an online Tlacolula Valley Zapotec talking dictionary  to local leaders. It was estimated that about 100 elderly speakers of this Zapotecan language remain.

Tlacolula Valley Zapotec is a VSO language.

Phonology

Consonants 

Most stops occur to be realized as fricatives and may fluctuate as well; /p b d ɡ/ become [ɸ β ð ɣ~x]. Rhotic consonants are voiceless when preceding a voiceless consonant; /ɾ~r/ ~ [ɾ̥~r̥]. Most consonants may also be geminated (ex. /t/ ~ /tː/). Approximant consonants are phonetically realized as [j̟] and [w̟]. [source]

Voiceless stops generally have a slight aspiration. Some sounds are only found in loanwords (/f/ and /j/).

The following is represented in the San Juan Guelavía dialect:

Vowels 

Tlacolula Valley Zapotec vowels are classified as modal, creaky (á), checked (a'), or breathy (ah).

Vowels may also occur as pharyngealized /vˤ/ or glottalized /vˀ/. 

Vowels may be differentiated by phonation and tone. Tlacolula Valley Zapotec has four tones: level high, level low, rising, and falling. Vowels differing in phonation often occur together in the same syllable as diphthongs. While a given vowel complex will always have the same tone, there are no tone contrasts for the same vowel complex.

The chart the level high, level low, rising, or falling the tone makes that the syllables make in the vowels of the word. Speakers take notice of the vowel complex, in the chart most words are spelled in the same way.

Morphology

Colonial Valley Zapotec (CVZ), a historical form of Valley Zapotec preserved in archival documents written during the Mexican colonial period. We provide data showing that positional verbs in CVZ have unique morphological properties and participate in a defined set of syntactic constructions, showing that positional verbs formed a formal class of verbs in Valley Zapotec as early as the mid-1500s. This work contributes to the typological literature on positional verbs, demonstrating the type of morphosyntactic work that can be done with a corpus of CVZ texts, and contributes to our understanding of the structure and development of the modern Zapotec positional verb system with implications for the larger Zapotec locative system.

Though the most basic order has the verb at the beginning of the sentence, all Zapotec languages have a number of preverbal positions for topical, focal, negative, and/or interrogative elements. The following example from Quiegolani Zapotec shows a focused element and an adverb before the verb 

Laad - foc    ʂ-unaa-poss-woman    Dolf-Rodolfo    d͡ʒe - already   z-u - prog-stand   nga - there = Roldofo's wife was already standing there.

Word order variation 
Zapotec languages also show the phenomenon known as pied-piping with inversion, which may change the head-initial order of phrases such as NP, PP, and QP.

Verbal morphology

Passive morphology 
A few varieties of Zapotec have passive morphology, shown by a prefix on the verb. Compare Texmelucan Zapotec root /o/ 'eat' and its passive stem /dug-o/ 'be eaten', with the prefix /dug-/. In many other cases, the transitive-intransitive verb pairs are appropriately described as causative vs. noncausative verb pairs and not as transitive-passive pairs.

Causative morphology 
Most if not all varieties of Zapotec languages have intransitive-transitive verb pairs which may be analyzed as noncausative vs. causative. The derivation may be obvious or not depending on the kinds of sounds that are involved. In the simplest cases, causative is transparently seen to be a prefix, cognate with /s-/ or with /k-/, but it may also require the use of a thematic vowel /u/, as in the following examples from Mitla Zapotec:

Setting aside possible abstract analyses of these facts (which posit an underlying prefix /k-/ that causes the changes seen superficially), we can illustrate the kinds of non-causative vs. causative pairs with the following examples. (Basic intransitive verbs are more common than basic transitive verbs, as in many languages.) The presence of the theme vowel /u-/ should be noted in the causative verbs, and in some cases is the only difference between the two verbs. One example of a double causative is also included here; these are not possible in all varieties.

Tlacolula Valley Zapotec differs from other Zapotec language varieties in its use of pronominal clitics in regards to formality and hierarchy.

Zapotec words contain three important syllabic positions: pre-key syllable, key syllable, and clitic. Some key syllables exhibit changes when they are non-phrase final; key syllables containing three vowels may reduce to two-vowel "combination form" sequences, while key syllables containing two vowels may reduce to one vowel syllables.

Noun morphology 
There is virtually no true morphology in the Zapotec noun. There is no case marking. Plurality is indicated (if at all) in the noun phrase, either by a number or a general quantifier that may be simply translated as "plural". Possessors are also indicated in the noun phrase either by a nominal or a pronominal element. (In both of these cases, since the plural morpheme and the pronouns may be enclitics, they are often written as if they were prefixes and suffixes, respectively, although they arguably are not true affixes.)

The only clear morphology in most varieties of Zapotec is the derivational prefix /ʂ-/ (or its cognate) that derives an inherently possessed noun from a noun that does not take a possessor. Compare Mitla Zapotec /koʰb/ 'dough', /ʃ-koʰb/ 'dough of'. The derived noun is used when the possessor is indicated, as in /ʃkoʰb ni/ 'his/her dough'.

Determiners

In Western Tlacolula Valley Zapotec, determiners come in varied forms and have a multitude of uses, with current research suggesting that they may have even more purposes that have yet to be discovered. Most often though, they are used to indicate definiteness, and make both spatial and temporal distinctions in regular discourse, which is similar to several other Zapotec languages. The use of these specific determiners is extremely similar to that of the demonstrative adjective and the definite article in English and Spanish. These four main determiners are: =rè (the proximal), =kang (the medial), =re (the distal), and =ki (the distal/invisible). The three spatial determiners each have their own specific usages: =rè (the proximal) is used to reference something close to the speaker, =re (the distal) has the same purpose for things that are slightly further away, but generally still visible, and =ki (the distal/invisible) is for referents that are not visible at all to the speaker at the time of utterance. It is possible that =kang (the medial) can be used to signify a medium distance between =rè and =re, but it is more likely that its main function is actually indicative. Also, research in the last decade has revealed that the distal =ki is typically the most commonly used determiner, since its function of denoting the past tense is required when telling folktales, local legends, or recounting personal narratives. At this time, there is still no evidence to suggest that the speaker’s position relative to that of the referent’s carries any significance in any of these scenarios.

Syntax 
Here are a few syntax words that were brought into a sentences and were put into charts:

Orthography 
Very few Tlacolula Valley Zapotec speakers are literate in the language. Of the two main orthographies used, twelve consonant sounds are generally agreed upon by both: p, t, c/qu, b, d, f, g/gu, j, ts, z, r, rr, and y. Six vowel sounds are generally agreed upon: a, e, i, o, u, and ë/ɨ. 

More complicated systems exist, which include contour tones and broader differentiation of vowel types. However, more recent analysis of the New Testament reveals that vowel types are differentiated orthographically to a greater extent than current vowel orthography systems suggest (for example, using an acute accent on single vowels to differentiate different words spelled the same way).

References

Bibliography
Liga Bíblica, La [Jones, Ted, et al.]. 1995. Xtiidx Dios Cun Ditsa (El Nuevo Testamento en el zapoteco de San Juan Guelavía y en español).
Jones, Ted E., and Lyle M. Knudson. 1977. "Guelavía Zapotec Phonemes". Studies in Otomanguean Phonology, ed., William R. Merrifield, pp. 163–80. [Dallas/Arlington]: SIL / University of Texas, Arlington.
Jones, Ted E., and Ann D. Church. 1985. "Personal pronouns in Guelavía Zapotec". S.I.L.-Mexico Workpapers 7: 1-15.

Munro, Pamela, Brook Danielle Lillehaugen and Felipe H. Lopez. 2007. Cali Chiu? A Course in Valley Zapotec. 
Munro, Pamela and Felipe H. Lopez, with Olivia V. Méndez, Rodrigo Garcia, and Michael R. Galant. 1999. Di'csyonaary X:tèe'n Dìi'zh Sah Sann Lu'uc (San Lucas Quiaviní Zapotec Dictionary/ Diccionario Zapoteco de San Lucas Quiaviní). Chicano Studies Research Center Publications, UCLA.
Suarez, Jorge A., 1983. The Mesoamerican Indian Languages. Cambridge University Press, p. 40.
Fenton, Donna. (2010). Multiple functions, multiple techniques: The role of methodology in a study of Zapotec determiners. In Andrea L. Berez, Jean Mulder, & Daisy Rosenblum (Eds.), Fieldwork and linguistic analysis in indigenous languages of the americas (125-145). Honolulu, HI: University of Hawai’i Press.

External links
Dictionary of Teotitlán del Valle Zapotec
Dictionary of Tlacolula Valley Zapotec

Zapotec languages
Endangered Oto-Manguean languages
Endangered indigenous languages of the Americas